The Bund: Gemeinschaft für ein sozialistisches Leben (Union for a Socialist Life) was a German Socialist organization founded in 1924 by Artur Jacobs. Dore Jacobs, created within this "Bund" a method of physical education which became a mode of resistance under Nazism and is still taught in Germany, in the same place in which it originated.

The Bund consisted of several hundred core members and many other participants trying to implement an objectively ethical standard of living in Germany.  With the rise of the Nazi Party in 1933, they became certain that racism and anti-Semitism lay at the core of Nazism.  They also realized they were too small to fight it at an institutional level, and so they engaged in practical efforts to make life better for all Jews, and especially for their own Jewish members.  Through their efforts they saved the lives of several Jews.  They all survived the Nazi period, but their numbers dwindled after World War II.  Some members were recognized for their efforts as Righteous Among the Nations by Yad Vashem in 2005.  They are considered important by the United States Holocaust Museum for illuminating the range of possibilities affecting German Jews before World War II.

References

Further reading
 Gelebte Utopie. Aus dem Leben einer Gemeinschaft. Dokumentation von Dore Jacobs (1975). – (Neu herausgebracht: Gelebte Utopie. Aus dem Leben einer Gemeinschaft. Nach einer Dokumentation von Dore Jacobs. Hg. v. Else Bramesfeld u. a.; Essen 1990. )
 Mark Roseman: In einem unbewachten Augenblick. Eine Frau überlebt im Untergrund. Aufbau Taschenbuch Verlag, Berlin 2004.
 Angela Genger: Zwei die sich retten konnten. Hilfe vom Bund für Marianne Strauß und Lisa Jacob aus Essen. In: Beate Kosmala, Claudia Schoppmann (Hg.): Sie blieben unsichtbar. Zeugnisse aus den Jahren 1941 bis 1945, Berlin 2006.
 Mark Roseman: Gerettete Geschichte: Der Bund, Gemeinschaft für sozialistisches Leben im Dritten Reich, in: „Mittelweg 36“, Zeitschrift des Hamburger Instituts für Sozialforschung, Jg. 16, Heft 1, 2007.
 Norbert Reichling: Mit Kant gegen die Nazis: Der „Bund“ und sein vergessenes „Judenhilfswerk“ im Rhein-Ruhr-Gebiet, in: Arno Lustiger: Rettungswiderstand. über die Judenretter in Europa während der NS-Zeit, Göttingen 2011.
 Mark Roseman: Surviving Undetected. The Bund, Rescue and Memory in Germany, in: Jacques Semelin, Claire Andrieu, and Sarah Gensburger: Resisting Genocide: The Multiple Forms of Rescue, Columbia University Press, New York 2011.
 H. Walter Kern: Stille Helden aus Essen. Widerstehen in der Zeit der Verfolgung 1933–1945, Essen 2014.

1924 establishments in Germany
Organizations established in 1924
Socialist organisations in Germany